is a 2007 film directed by Hisham Zaman and produced in Norway.

Plot
Renas, a Kurdish refugee living in the northern part of Norway in a remote desolate place, is awaiting the arrival of his fiancée, Fermesk. The couple have never met before, and their first encounter at the airport does not meet up to their expectations.

Reviews

The film was reviewed by all major newspapers, receiving a "die throw" of 5 out of 6 in Aftenposten and Dagbladet, and 4 in VG and Nordlys

Awards
Best Actor (Årets mannlige skuespiller), Raouf Saraj, Amanda Awards, Norway, 2007.
Grand Prix José Giovanni, Festival International Du Film De Montagne D'Autrans, France, 2007.

See also
Cinema of Norway

References

External links

2007 films
2007 drama films
Kurdish-language films
Norwegian drama films